Robin Batteau (born January 12, 1948) is an American composer, singer-songwriter, and music producer. Batteau  is the brother of singer/songwriter David Batteau. He attended Phillips Academy in Andover and should have graduated from Harvard University in 1969, but actually finished his degree in 2021. Batteau worked with his brother David as Batteaux, releasing one album on Columbia Records in 1971. He performed with David Buskin as Buskin and Batteau but in April 2014 the duo split up. He recorded with Tom Rush. Batteau was awarded the Kate Wolf Memorial Award by the World Folk Music Association in 1991.

References

External links
 Robin Batteau's Official Site
 Buskin and Batteau website
 Compton and Batteau Album 

Living people
1948 births
Harvard University alumni
American folk musicians
Jingle writers